Ryer Island is an island in Suisun Bay at the mouth of the Sacramento-San Joaquin River Delta in Solano County, California, eight miles east-northeast of Benicia. It is administered by Reclamation District 501, and is in the Suisun Resource Conservation District. At the time of statehood it was known as Kings Island, and is labeled as such on an 1850 survey map of the San Francisco Bay area made by Cadwalader Ringgold as well as an 1854 map of the area by Henry Lange. It is labeled, along with Deadman Island, Joice Island, Grizzly Island, Simmons Island, and Roe Island, on a 1902 USGS map of the area.

See also
 List of islands of California

References

Islands of the San Francisco Bay Area
Islands of the Sacramento–San Joaquin River Delta
Islands of Northern California
Islands of Suisun Bay
Islands of Solano County, California